Pictobalcis is a currently monotypic genus in the family Eulimidae. As of 2016 the only known species is P. articulata.

Description

Pictobalcis articulata is the largest eulimid occurring in its range, with a high turretellid-like polished shell patterned in wavy vertical lines of chestnut brown or dark red on a background of cream to dark red, up to 26mm in length. Unlike other eulimids this species is coastal, from low intertidal down to 30 metres deep. The animal is ectoparasitic like other genera in the family, but due to its rarity it has not been studied and the host or hosts it depends on are not known. Empty shells are washed into tide pools or found inhabited by hermit crabs.

Distribution

Occurs in Australia off New South Wales, South Australia and Victoria, also the north-eastern coast of the North Island and the Kermadec Islands, New Zealand, and Norfolk Island. Has been reported from Japan and the Philippines, and empty shells have been reportedly found in New Caledonia.

References

 Laseron, C. 1955. Revision of the New South Wales eulimoid shells. The Australian Zoologist 12(2): 83-107, pls 1-3, figs 1-78 
 Warén A. (1984) A generic revision of the family Eulimidae (Gastropoda, Prosobranchia). Journal of Molluscan Studies suppl. 13: 1-96.

External links 
Marine Species Identification Portal

Eulimidae